Charles Monroe may refer to:

Charles Monroe (In Death)
Charles Monroe of Battle of Monroe's Crossroads

See also
Charles Monro (disambiguation)
Charlie Monroe (1903–1975)
Charles Munroe